Rosewarne is a surname. Notable people with the surname include:

Dan Rosewarne (born 1981), New Zealand politician
Harold Rosewarne (1930–2018), Australian rules footballer
Keith Rosewarne (1924–2008), Australian rules footballer
Ken Rosewarne (1911–1987), Australian rules footballer

Surnames of British Isles origin